Camp Blanding Joint Training Center is the primary military reservation and training base for the Florida National Guard, both the Florida Army National Guard and certain nonflying activities of the Florida Air National Guard. The installation is located in Clay County, Florida, near the city of Starke. It also hosts other Reserve, Army National Guard, Air National Guard, and some Active Component training for the U.S. Armed Forces.

Additionally, Camp Blanding serves as a training center for many ROTC units, both Army and Navy, as well as serving for the Florida Wing Summer Encampment for the Civil Air Patrol/US Air Force Auxiliary's Cadet Program each year. Jacksonville University and University of South Florida NROTC Battalions continue to conduct their week-long orientation at Camp Blanding each August before the college semester starts. Camp Blanding also hosts the Audie Murphy Field Training Exercise where Army ROTC units from more than a dozen Florida, Georgia, and Puerto Rican universities gather to conduct a five-day field problem focusing on small-unit tactics, land navigation, and leadership development every April.

Camp Blanding is the primary training site for most of the Florida National Guard's military units and the main combat arms brigade, the 53rd Infantry Brigade of the Florida Army National Guard. It is also home to the headquarters and support companies of the 3-20th Special Forces Group, the 211th Infantry Regiment, and the 2-111th Airfield Operations Battalion  of the 111th Aviation Regiment.

Camp Blanding also houses several non-flying units of the Florida Air National Guard, including the 202nd RED HORSE Squadron, 159th Weather Flight, 131st Training Flight, and the joint Army/Air Force 44th Civil Support Team. The base is also a training location for several counter-drug units and law enforcement agencies in Florida and functions as the alternate Emergency Operations Center  for Florida.

In 2008, Camp Blanding became host to the Army's latest air assault course in response to the growing need for air assault-trained individuals for the continuing operations in Iraq and Afghanistan. Also, a bombing and strafing target for military aircraft, primarily used by the Navy, Marine Corps, and Air Force, is located on the southern portion of the post.

Camp Blanding is home to the Multijurisdictional Counterdrug Task Force Training, which provides unique, tuition-free military and counterdrug training for local, state, federal, and military criminal justice professionals, as well as awareness training for community leaders.

Camp Blanding is also home to the Combating Transnational Organized Crime Center of Excellence, which provides unique, tuition-free training in support of Department of Defense strategies, and has campuses on Camp Blanding, at St. Petersburg College in St. Petersburg, Florida, and on Camp Murray near Tacoma, Washington.

Camp Blanding is also home to the annual FBI National Academy Associates Youth Leadership Academy (YLA). The YLA takes place during the summer and involves a rigorous selection process of 14-16 year olds throughout Florida. YLA exposes students to top-tier law enforcement professionals from across Florida.

History

The new camp was named for Albert H. Blanding, who had been commissioned in the Florida National Guard in 1899, and was then a Major General and Chief of the National Guard Bureau. In 1940, as the threat of war increased and the United States Army was built up, Camp Blanding became a Federal facility housing two infantry divisions plus auxiliary units. Between 1940 and 1943, nine US Army infantry divisions trained at Camp Blanding, including: 1st Infantry Division, 29th Infantry Division, 30th Infantry Division, 31st Infantry Division, 36th Infantry Division, 43rd Infantry Division, 63rd Infantry Division, 66th Infantry Division, and 79th Infantry Division. In 1943, Camp Blanding became an Infantry Replacement Center, training soldiers to be sent to existing infantry divisions as replacements, providing a high percentage of the replacements sent to Army combat units. During WWII more than 800,000 soldiers where trained at Camp Blanding.

The base was a holding center for 343 Japanese, German, and Italian immigrant residents of the United States. A small cemetery is located on the grounds of the former POW camp. In 1946 the actual bodies were removed to the Ft. Benning however the grave markers remain. Additionally five settler era cemeteries are located on Camp Blanding property. Most are not maintained and are heavily overgrown.

At one point during the war, the camp contained the population of the fourth-largest city in Florida. It had 10,000 buildings,  of paved roads, and the largest hospital in the state. It was one of the largest training bases in the country. There were several newspapers published at the camp during the war, which helped provide insights into daily life at the camp, such as The Bulletin, the Bayonet, and the Camp Blanding Report. After the war, Camp Blanding was the headquarters of the Military District of Florida and was commanded by Brigadier General Charles S. Kilburn.

An expeditionary airfield consisting of two gravel runways capable of accommodating C-130 Hercules aircraft was added in the 1970s along with the reactivation of the artillery training range and parachute drop zones.

From 2001 until 2008, Camp Blanding was used by the Southeast Region of the Civil Air Patrol to host their Southeast Region Encampment for cadets. The Florida Wing of Civil Air Patrol continues to use Camp Blanding for their wing-level summer cadet encampments.

Camp Blanding Museum and Memorial Park
Camp Blanding is also home to the Camp Blanding Museum and Memorial Park. Open to the public, the facility contains a history museum in one of Camp Blanding's restored World War II buildings, tracing the history of both Camp Blanding and the Florida National Guard. Outdoor exhibits and displays include equipment and Army, Navy, and Air Force aircraft from World War II, the Korean War, the Vietnam War, the Cold War, and Operation Desert Storm, including captured Soviet-manufactured Iraqi equipment from the last conflict.

References

External links
Globalsecurity.org page
Camp Blanding Museum and Memorial Park  - official site
Camp Blanding Museum  - Camp Blanding Museum and Historical Associates
U.S. Air Force 125th Fighter Wing's Camp Blanding History page
 Multijurisdictional Counterdrug Task Force Training website
 Combating Transnational Organized Crime Center of Excellence website

Blanding
Blanding
Military installations in Florida
Buildings and structures in Clay County, Florida
Military and war museums in Florida
Installations of the United States Army National Guard
Museums in Clay County, Florida
Parks in Clay County, Florida
1940 establishments in Florida